Gas carbon is a carbon that is obtained when the destructive distillation of coal is done or when petroleum products are heated at high temperatures in a closed container. It appears as a compact, amorphous, grey solid deposited on the walls of a container that holds the gas carbon. It is also a good conductor of heat and electricity, similar to graphite. Applications include battery plates, in arc lamps, and coal gas.

External links
 What Does That Mean? Definition of: gas carbon

References

Pyrolysis